Halldór Björnsson may refer to:

 Halldór Orri Björnsson (born 1987), Icelandic footballer
 Halldór Björnsson (footballer, born 1948), Icelandic footballer